William Blair Roberts (December 10, 1881 - April 25, 1964) was a bishop in The Episcopal Church, serving in South Dakota.

Early life and education
Roberts was born on December 10, 1881, in Detroit, Michigan, the son of William Jackson Roberts and Jane Eliza Fisher. He was educated at the public school of Hartford, Connecticut, and then studied at Trinity College, graduating with a Bachelor of Arts in 1905, and being awarded a Doctor of Divinity in 1923. He also enrolled at Berkeley Divinity School, from where he graduated with a Bachelor of Divinity in 1908, and a Doctor of Divinity in 1923.

Ordained ministry
Roberts was ordained deacon on June 3, 1908, by Bishop Chauncey B. Brewster of Connecticut, and priest on June 20, 1909, by Bishop Frederick Foote Johnson. He served as a missionary in Rosebud, South Dakota between 1908 and 1922. He also served as a chaplain in the American Expeditionary Forces between August 1918 and June 1919. In 1917, he also became Dean of Rosebud.

Bishop
On December 6, 1922, he was consecrated suffragan bishop of South Dakota, in Calvary Cathedral, Sioux Falls. On September 29, 1931, he was elected Bishop of South Dakota, remained so until his retirement on January 1, 1954.

References

1881 births
1964 deaths
20th-century American Episcopalians
Episcopal bishops of South Dakota
Clergy from Detroit
Trinity College (Connecticut) alumni
Berkeley Divinity School alumni